Filippo Carcano (Milan, 1840–1914) was an Italian painter.

Biography
A pupil of Francesco Hayez at the Brera Academy in Milan as from 1855, Carcano won the Canonica Prize with a work on a historical subject in 1862, while experimenting in the same period with painting from life. Carcano became friends with Francesco Filippini and Eugenio Gignous, with whom he would sometimes go to paint in Gignese. His interest in themes connected with reality is confirmed in subsequent works presenting scenes of an immediacy that reflects the contemporary developments in the field of the photography. One example is Break Time during Work on the Exhibition of 1881 (1887, Galleria d’Arte Moderna, Milan), presented at the Esposizione Nazionale di Belle Arti di Milano in 1881.

A leading figure in the school of Lombard Naturalism, he combined scenes of everyday life with numerous landscapes, featuring the surroundings of Lake Maggiore and the Mottarone as from the 1870s and the mountain peaks on the border with Switzerland at the end of the century. It was in the same period that he took up Symbolism, winning the Prince Umberto Prize at the Milan Triennale of 1897. Among his pupils was Umberto Bazzoli. One of his works is on display of the Museo Cantonale d'Arte of Lugano. The earthen tones and proletarian thematics often recall the works of Giuseppe Pellizza da Volpedo. Of his landscapes, one author states his name is associated with pictures of limitless and nebulous horizons.

Gallery

References
 Laura Casone, Filippo Carcano, online catalogue Artgate by Fondazione Cariplo, 2010, CC BY-SA (source for the first revision of this article).

Fillipo Carcano Archive:

External links
 
 

19th-century Italian painters
Italian male painters
20th-century Italian painters
Painters from Milan
Brera Academy alumni
1840 births
1914 deaths
19th-century Italian male artists
20th-century Italian male artists